Gella Vandecaveye (born 5 June 1973 in Kortrijk, Belgium) is a judoka from Belgium who competed at four Olympic Games.

At the 1996 Summer Olympics she won the silver medal in the women's half-middleweight category. Four years later, at the 2000 Summer Olympics in Sydney, she captured a second medal: a bronze one in the same category. She became World Champion in 1993 and 2001 and was European champion seven times in the 1994–2001 period.

Gella Vandecaveye was named "1999 European Judoka of the Year".

Footnotes

External links

 
 
 Judo Legends

1973 births
Living people
Belgian female judoka
Olympic judoka of Belgium
Judoka at the 1992 Summer Olympics
Judoka at the 1996 Summer Olympics
Judoka at the 2000 Summer Olympics
Judoka at the 2004 Summer Olympics
Olympic silver medalists for Belgium
Olympic bronze medalists for Belgium
Olympic medalists in judo
Sportspeople from Kortrijk
Flemish sportspeople
Medalists at the 2000 Summer Olympics
Medalists at the 1996 Summer Olympics
Goodwill Games medalists in judo
Competitors at the 1994 Goodwill Games